Lake Hancock is a swampy natural freshwater lake on the west side of Orlando, Florida, in Orange County, Florida. This lake is long and winding. To the west side of the lake is Florida State Road 429, a toll highway. Residential housing surrounds all, but the east end of the lake.

This lake has no public boat docks, no public swimming areas and there is no public access to this lake.

References

Lakes of Orange County, Florida